Lac-des-Aigles is a municipality in the Témiscouata Regional County Municipality of the Bas-Saint-Laurent region of Quebec, Canada. The population is 495. Its economy is mainly based on agriculture and forestry. It is located southeast of Rimouski, near Esprit-Saint.

See also
 List of municipalities in Quebec

References

External links

Municipalities in Quebec
Incorporated places in Bas-Saint-Laurent